Rohini Molleti, known professionally as Rohini,  is an Indian actress, screenwriter, and lyricist. She has mainly acted in Malayalam,Telugu, Tamil films along with few Kannada films. Having started her acting career at five, she has about 130 south Indian films to her credit. She received National Award of Special Mention and Andhra Pradesh state Nandi Special Jury Award for Best Performance in 1995 for the film Stri.

Early life
A native of Anakapalli, Andhra Pradesh, Rohini spent all her childhood in Chennai. Her father Appa Rao Naidu was a panchyat officer and mother Radha was a housewife. Her father always wanted to become an actor, though he couldn't be an actor he encouraged his daughter to become an actress and he fulfilled his ambition through his daughter. Her mother died when she was five years old and father remarried later.

Personal life

She was married to actor Raghuvaran in 1996. The couple have a son Rishi Varan, born in 2000. The couple divorced in 2004.

Career

She started her career in 1976 as a child actress. She was first seen as a wide-eyed five year old in Yashoda Krishna, a Telugu film.
She is also a popular dubbing artist in the Telugu and Tamil industries. She has voiced six characters in five of Mani Ratnam's films. She lent her voice to actresses like Jyothika (Vettaiyaadu Vilaiyaadu), Aishwarya Rai (Iruvar and Raavanan), Manisha Koirala (Bombay) and Amala (Shiva). She has also dubbed for Girija Shettar in Geethanjali.

She wrote lyrics for the Tamil film Pachaikili Muthucharam, before ending another hiatus by writing all songs in the album, Maalai Pozhudhin Mayakathilaey. Her acting skills were recognized and she was given the Kalaimamani award recently.

She writes episodes for Tamil TV serials. She started writing scripts for TV series way back in 1996, and has adapted the Sahithya Academy Award winning novel Verukku Neer for a tele film in 2005. She hosted the live TV talk show Kelvigal Aayiram for Vijay TV, which she said "dealt with issues close to my heart". She moderated the Tamil programme Azhagiya Tamizh Magal on Kalaignar TV and has worked as the anchor of Raj TV's show, Rohini's Box Office in which she reviewed the latest releases.

Being an activist for AIDS awareness, Rohini has also directed short films for M.G.R. Medical University and Tamil Nadu Aids Control Society. In 2008, Rohini had directed a 50-minute documentary Silent Hues about film industry's Child actresss, she being one herself. In 2013, she has directed a feature film Appavin Meesai which is yet to be released.

Awards

 1995 - National Film Award - Special Mention - Stri
 1995 - Nandi Award for Special Jury Best Performance - Stri
2017 - Vanitha Film Awards - Best supporting actress (Guppy, Action Hero Biju)
2017 - CPC Awards for Best supporting actress (Guppy, Action Hero Biju)

Filmography

Rohini has mainly acted in Malayalam, Telugu, Tamil, films along with few Kannada films. Having started her acting career at five, she has about 130 south Indian films to her credit.

As actress

As lyricist
 2007 - Pachaikili Muthucharam (Unakkul Naane)
 2009 - Villu (Jalsa)
 2010 - Mundhinam Paartheney (Maya, Kanavena)
 2012 - Maalai Pozhudhin Mayakathilaey (all songs)
 2013 - 11th Chennai International Film Festival Anthem (Song composed by Prakash Nikki)
 2020 - Galatta kalyanam (murali mogha) (Song composed by A.R.Rahman)

As director
1995 - Chinna Chinna Aasai - Ganga (Sun tv)
 2008 - Silent Hues (documentary film)

Dubbing artist

As playback singer
 1995 - Chinna Vathiyar - Kanmaniye Kanmaniye (along with S. P. Balasubrahmanyam)

Television
 Tamil
 Chinna Chinna Aasai - Ganga (Sun TV (India) ) acted and directed
 Kelvigal Aayiram (Vijay TV) as Host
 Azhagiya Tamizh Magal (Kalaignar TV) as Moderator
 Rohini's Box Office (Raj TV) as Host
 Kelvigal Neram (Vendhar TV) as Host
Geethanjali - Telefilm (Doordarshan) as Writer 
	Engae Aval- Actress
 Malayalam
Nerukku Neer - Telefilm (Doordarshan) Screenplay and lyrics
Kadha Ithu Vare (Mazhavil Manorama) as Host
Ugram Ujjwalam Season 2 Grand Finale (Mazhavil Manorama) as Judge
Comedy Stars season 2 (Asianet) as Judge
Red Carpet (Amrita TV)  as Mentor
Oru Chiri Iruchiri Bumper Chiri (Mazhavil Manorama) as Mentor/Judge
Telugu
Addham (Aha)

References

External links

Rohini at MSI

Living people
Year of birth missing (living people)
Indian film actresses
Actresses in Telugu cinema
Actresses in Tamil cinema
Actresses in Malayalam cinema
20th-century Indian actresses
21st-century Indian actresses
Child actresses in Telugu cinema
Actresses from Visakhapatnam
Actresses in Hindi cinema
Indian voice actresses
Tamil-language lyricists
Musicians from Visakhapatnam
Singers from Andhra Pradesh
Indian television actresses
Actresses in Hindi television
Actresses in Telugu television
Tamil film directors
Indian women film directors
Women musicians from Andhra Pradesh
Film directors from Andhra Pradesh
21st-century Indian film directors
Screenwriters from Andhra Pradesh
Writers from Visakhapatnam
Special Mention (feature film) National Film Award winners
Actresses in Tamil television
Actresses in Malayalam television
Actresses in Kannada cinema
Tamil television directors
Tamil television writers